The following outline is provided as an overview of and topical guide to Philadelphia:

Philadelphia – largest city in the Commonwealth of Pennsylvania, the second largest city on the East Coast of the United States, and the fifth-most-populous city in the United States. It is located in the Northeastern United States along the Delaware and Schuylkill rivers, and it is the only consolidated city-county in Pennsylvania.

General information 
 Pronunciation: 
 Common English name(s): Philadelphia
 Official English name(s): City of Philadelphia
 Nicknames of Philadelphia
 Philly
 The City of Brotherly Love
 Adjectival(s): Philadelphian
 Demonym(s): Philadelphians
 Rankings
 largest city in Pennsylvania
 second largest city on the East Coast
 fifth-most populous city in the U.S.

Geography of Philadelphia 
 Philadelphia is: a city in the state of Pennsylvania, in the United States
 Atlas of Philadelphia
 Population of Philadelphia
 2010 U.S. Census: 1,526,006 people
 2000 U.S. Census: 1,517,550 people (to see why the city shrank, see White flight)
 1950 U.S. Census: 2,071,605 people
 Land area of Philadelphia: 134.101 sq mi

Location of Philadelphia 
 Philadelphia is situated within the following regions:
 Northern Hemisphere
 Western Hemisphere
 North America
 Northern America
 United States
 Pennsylvania
 Delaware Valley
 Time zone(s): Eastern Time Zone (UTC−05:00)

Environment of Philadelphia 
 Climate of Philadelphia

Landforms of Philadelphia 
 Delaware River
 Schuylkill River

Areas of Philadelphia

Districts of Philadelphia 
 Center City

Neighborhoods in Philadelphia 
 List of Philadelphia neighborhoods

Locations in Philadelphia 
 List of sites of interest in Philadelphia

Demographics of Philadelphia 
Demographics of Philadelphia

Law and government in Philadelphia 
 List of mayors of Philadelphia
 Philadelphia City Council
 Philadelphia Police Department
 Crime in Philadelphia
 Black Mafia
 K&A Gang
 Philadelphia crime family
 Philadelphia Greek Mob

History of Philadelphia 
 History of Philadelphia

History of Philadelphia, by period
 History of the area before the founding of Philadelphia
 Lenape (Native American tribe)
 Shackamaxon
 New Sweden
 Dutch colonization
 New Netherland
 Treaty of Westminster (1674)
 Province of Pennsylvania
 William Penn – founder of the Province of Pennsylvania (a British colony), also founded Philadelphia
 Benjamin Franklin
 Pennsylvania Gazette (1729) – located in Philadelphia, Ben Franklin purchased an existing newspaper, and shortened its name to this.
 Library Company of Philadelphia (1731)
 Poor Richard's Almanack (1733)
 Union Fire Company (1736)
 American Philosophical Society (1743)
 111th Infantry Regiment (1747)
 The Academy and College of Philadelphia (1749) – was merged in 1791 with the University of the State of Pennsylvania to become the University of Pennsylvania.
 Pennsylvania Hospital (1751)
 Construction of Pennsylvania State House completed (1753) – built for the colonial legislature of the Province of Pennsylvania. It was the building in which the United States was born.  Now it is known as Independence Hall.
 American Revolution
 First Continental Congress
 Second Continental Congress (1775-1787) – headquartered in Independence Hall, in Philadelphia, the Congress acted as the de facto national government of what became the United States, by raising armies, directing strategy, appointing diplomats, and making formal treaties.
 United States Declaration of Independence (July 4, 1776) – succession of the Thirteen Colonies from the Kingdom of Great Britain, enacted by the Continental Congress.  This made Philadelphia the first capital of the United States, by virtue of the Continental Congress being headquartered there.
 American Revolutionary War (1775–1783)
 Articles of Confederation (November 15, 1777)
 Philadelphia campaign (1777–1778) – British initiative to gain control of Philadelphia, which was then the seat of the Second Continental Congress.
 Capture of Philadelphia (1777)
 Pennsylvania Mutiny of 1783 – anti-government protest by nearly 400 soldiers of the Continental Army in June 1783. The mutiny, and the refusal of the Executive Council of Pennsylvania to stop it, ultimately resulted in Congress vacating Philadelphia and the creation of the District of Columbia to serve as the national capital.
 Philadelphia as state capital (1776-1799)
 Pennsylvania Constitution of 1776
 Supreme Executive Council of the Commonwealth of Pennsylvania
 State capital (1776-1799)
 Philadelphia Convention (May 25 to September 17, 1787) – met in Independence Hall, where the states' delegates created the United States Constitution, placing the Convention among the most significant events in the history of the United States.
 Drafting of the Constitution of the United States (1787)
 Temporary capital of the United States (1790-1800) – Philadelphia served as the country's temporary capital while Washington, D.C. was being planned and developed.
 Philadelphia during World War II
 Philadelphia Experiment

Culture in Philadelphia 
Culture of Philadelphia
 Architecture of Philadelphia
 List of tallest buildings in Philadelphia
 Cuisine of Philadelphia
 Cheesesteak
 Language in Philadelphia
 Philadelphia dialect
 Media in Philadelphia
 Museums in Philadelphia
 List of people from Philadelphia
 Symbols of Philadelphia
 Flag of Philadelphia
 Seal of Philadelphia

Art in Philadelphia 
 Music of Philadelphia
 Philadelphia soul
 Public art in Philadelphia

Religion in Philadelphia 
 Christianity in Philadelphia
 Diocese of Philadelphia
 Catholicism in Philadelphia
 Roman Catholic Archdiocese of Philadelphia
 Ukrainian Catholic Archeparchy of Philadelphia
 Judaism in Philadelphia
 History of the Jews in Philadelphia

Sports in Philadelphia 
Sports in Philadelphia
 South Philadelphia Sports Complex
 Lincoln Financial Field ("The Linc") – home to the Philadelphia Eagles (football team)
 Citizens Bank Park – home to the Philadelphia Phillies (baseball team)
 Wells Fargo Center – home to the:
 Philadelphia Flyers (hockey team)
 Philadelphia 76ers (basketball team)
 Philadelphia Wings (lacrosse team)
 Philadelphia Sports Hall of Fame
 Baseball in Philadelphia
 Philadelphia Phillies
 Baseball parks in Philadelphia
 Philadelphia Baseball Wall of Fame
 Basketball in Philadelphia
 Philadelphia 76ers
 Football in Philadelphia
 American football in Philadelphia
 Philadelphia Eagles
 Soccer in Philadelphia
 Philadelphia Union (soccer team)
 Hockey in Philadelphia
 Philadelphia Flyers
 Lacrosse in Philadelphia
 Philadelphia Wings
 Running in Philadelphia
 Philadelphia Marathon

Economy and infrastructure of Philadelphia 
Economy of Philadelphia
 List of companies based in the Philadelphia area
 Public services in Philadelphia
 Philadelphia Fire Department
 Philadelphia Police Department
 Philadelphia Public Library
 Tourism in Philadelphia
 List of sites of interest in Philadelphia

Transportation in Philadelphia 
Transportation in Philadelphia
 Philadelphia subway (disambiguation)
 List of Philadelphia subway stations

Education in Philadelphia 
 Education in Philadelphia

See also 
 Outline of geography

References

External links 

 City of Philadelphia government
 Historic Philadelphia Photographs
 Greater Philadelphia GeoHistory Network – historical maps and atlases of Philadelphia
 philly.com – Local news
 Visitor Site for Greater Philadelphia
 Official Convention & Visitors Site for Philadelphia

Philadelphia
Philadelphia
 1